Cao Minh (xã Cao Minh) is a commune in Tràng Định District, Lạng Sơn Province, Vietnam. 

Cao Minh borders Bắc Kạn Province to the west, and the communes Đoàn Kết and Tân Tiến to the northeast and south. Its administrative center is at Vàng Can.

Cao Minh has a population of 1109 (1997) in 8 villages. 64% of the population are Mieu (officially a subgroup of the Hmong) and most of the rest Yao and Tay, with a very small Nung minority.

The 8 villages of Cao Minh Commune are as follows (Nguyen 2007:3).
Vàng Can
Khuổi Vai
Khuổi Lài (ethnically mixed village)
Khuổi Lập
Khuổi Giảo (largest village; includes Khuổi Giảo, Khuổi Lài, and Khuổi Hẻo hamlets)
Khuổi Lứng (predominantly Yao)
Khuổi Tó
Kéo Đanh (predominantly Yao)

References

Communes of Lạng Sơn province
Populated places in Lạng Sơn province